Michael Allan Warren (born 26 October 1948) is an English portrait photographer, primarily known for his images of members of high society. An actor and talent manager in his youth, he rose to prominence for portraits of British nobility, politicians, and celebrities. His subjects include Alec Douglas-Home, Cary Grant, Sophia Loren, Charles III, Louis Mountbatten and Laurence Olivier.

Early life and education
After growing up in post-war London with his mother, Warren attended Terry's Juveniles, a stage school based in the Drury Lane Theatre. It was during this period that he attended auditions through which he received several assignments. One such piece of work was as a child presenter in "The Five O'clock Club", which afforded him the opportunity to associate with individuals such as Marc Bolan (then performing as "Toby Tyler"), who would later employ Warren as his first manager.

Career
Warren started his photographic career at the age of 20, when he was acting in Alan Bennett's play Forty Years On with John Gielgud in the West End at the Apollo Theatre. Around this time, Warren bought his first second-hand camera and began to take photographs of his fellow actors. His first major assignment was in 1969 when his friend Mickey Deans asked him to cover his wedding to Judy Garland, which marked the beginning of Warren's work as a professional photographer.

After this decisive event, Warren embarked on his photography career, throughout which he took portraits of personalities including many actors, writers, musicians, politicians and members of the British royal family. In the early 1980s Warren embarked on a quest to photograph all 30 British dukes. Together with Angus Montagu, 12th Duke of Manchester he set up the Duke's Trust, a charity for children in need. Warren has uploaded many pictures from his archive to Wikimedia Commons.

In the early 1990s, Warren embarked on writing plays. One of his works, The Lady of Phillimore Walk, was directed by Frank Dunlop and critics went as far as comparing it to Sleuth, a thriller written by Anthony Shaffer. The cast of The Lady of Phillimore Walk consisted of Zena Walker and Philip Lowrie; and saw productions in the United States.

Warren invented the Hankybreathe, a handkerchief which allows the user to inhale air through a carbon filter at the mouth, to filter out the noxious effects of exhaust emissions. The invention, which is meant to be dabbed in eucalyptus oil, harks back to the nosegay and stems from Warren's experience with asthma in heavily polluted London.

Gallery

Bibliography
Nobs & Nosh – Eating with the Beautiful People, 1975
Confessions of a Society Photographer, 1976
The Dukes of Britain, 1986
The Lady of Phillimore Walk (play), 1991
Dukes, Queens and Other Stories, 1999
Strangers in the Buff, August 2007
Carpet Dwellers, October 2007
Nein Camp, December 2012
Stand By To Repel All Boarders, December 2014
The Lady of Phillimore Walk, 2015
The Matching Pair Part 1: No Good Deed, 2021
Double Act, 2022

References

1948 births
Living people
English male stage actors
English dramatists and playwrights
English memoirists
British portrait photographers
Male actors from London
Writers from London
Photographers from London
People from Wimbledon, London
English male dramatists and playwrights
English male non-fiction writers